Molzhaninovsky District is an administrative district (raion), one of the sixteen in Northern Administrative Okrug of the federal city of Moscow, Russia. The area of the district is  As of the 2010 Census, the total population of the district was 3,521.

Municipal status
As a municipal division, it is incorporated as Molzhaninovsky Municipal Okrug.

References

Notes

Sources



Districts of Moscow
Northern Administrative Okrug